Carl Daniel Reindolf is a Ghanaian politician and was a member of the first parliament of the second Republic of Ghana. He represented the Okaikwei constituency under the membership of the progress party (PP)

Early life and education 
Victor was born on 29 June 1927. He attended Accra High School and American Academy of Public Relations where he obtained a Bachelor of Laws in Law and Public Relations. He later worked as an Entrepreneur, Barrister and Solicitor before going into Parliament.

Politics 
He began his political career in 1969 when he became the parliamentary candidate for the Progress Party (PP) to represent his constituency in the Greater Accra of Ghana prior to the commencement of the 1969 Ghanaian parliamentary election.

He was sworn into the First Parliament of the Second Republic of Ghana on 1 October 1969, after being pronounced winner at the 1969 Ghanaian election held on 26 August 1969. and his tenure ended on 13 January 1972.

Personal life 
He is a Male in gender and Christian in faith.

References 

1927 births
Ghanaian MPs 1969–1972
Living people